DJ Frank may refer to:

DJ F.R.A.N.K., at times DJ Frank, Belgian DJ and record producer and at one time remixer of The Underdog Project
DJ Frank E, American DJ